Okres na severu is a Czechoslovak TV series filmed by Evžen Sokolovský in 1981.

Synopsis
The main character is Josef Pláteník, a conscientious and responsible man, and the leader of the Communist party in Brod, a fast-growing industrial region. All of his days are full of problems that must be solved.

External links
 
 Okres na severu on CSFD

Czechoslovak television series
1981 Czechoslovak television series debuts
Czech drama television series
1980s Czechoslovak television series
1990s Czech television series
Czech political television series
Czechoslovak Television original programming